Minhaj Welfare Foundation (MWF) is a non-governmental international relief and welfare organisation and a branch of Minhaj-ul-Quran International. It was founded on 17 October 1989 by Muhammad Tahir-ul-Qadri, and registered in the UK.

MWF's projects can be divided into four major categories:  education, health care, emergency aid and welfare support.

Selected works
 70,000 free eye-medical treatments.
 Relief work in the Swat and Malakand division by providing relief aid. This included temporary shelters, medical dispensaries, educational establishments and food packets. Minhaj Welfare Foundation has publicly vowed that it will not stop the relief work in Swat until every migrant has returned home.
 Emergency relief in response to the 2010 Pakistan floods, Cyclone Sidr (Bangladesh), tsunami (Indonesia), Sudan, Gaza Crisis, SWAT valley.
Each year MWF helps to organise and manage the second largest Itekaaf (Spiritual Retreat during Ramadan) in the whole world after the one in Makkah and Madina.
In Pakistan, MWF was the first charity in the history of the country to arrange and fund collective-marriage ceremonies for the needy.
 Aghosh Orphan Care Home.

References

External links
 

Minhaj-ul-Quran
Non-profit organisations based in Pakistan
Social welfare charities
Organizations established in 1988
Emergency organizations
Foundations based in Pakistan